Kingsteignton, is a town and civil parish in South Devon, England. It lies at the head of the Teign Estuary to the west of Teignmouth in the Teignbridge district. It is bypassed by the A380 and is also on the A383, A381, B3193 and B3195. Kingsteignton is currently represented in parliament by Anne Marie Morris, as part of the Newton Abbot Constituency.The local education centers (schools) include : Rydon Primary School, Teign School and Saint Michael's School Church of England School.

Kingsteignton has a population of over 11,000. The threat of being incorporated into the nearby town of Newton Abbot prompted the parish council to change Kingsteignton's status to a town. The change took effect from 1 January 2009. The town has two electoral wards (east and west). Their combined populations at the 2011 census was 11,147

History
Founded in the early 8th century by the kings of Wessex as the centre of a vast Saxon estate that extended from Teignmouth to Manaton, Kingsteignton was a key settlement in Saxon times and gave its name to the Saxon hundred of Teignton. The hundred moot or court was held in the village but it appears that by the time of the Domesday Survey the name of the hundred had been changed to Teignbridge, possibly indicating that the site of the court had been moved. As a royal vill Kingsteignton provided rich pickings for Danish raiders who plundered it in 1001.

Medieval prosperity funded the rebuilding of the parish church (St Michaels) in the 15th century, its 85-foot tower being constructed in the 1480s. From the medieval period to the mid-19th century the parish church held an important position as the mother church of Highweek and Newton Bushell.

The Fairwater Leat, fed by the springs at Rydon, superseded the Honeywell Spring as the established water supply in the Middle Ages and also supplied the power for three mills. A drought is said to have given rise to the annual Ram Roasting fair. According to legend there was insufficient water to baptise a child so a ram was sacrificed to the gods of the local spring. Water sprang forth and a ram has been roasted ever since at the fair, held nowadays on the late May bank holiday. Whit Tuesday was the traditional day for the fair but it was switched to Whit Monday in the early 1950s to fit in with school holidays and the later switch to the late May bank holiday was made for the same reason when the bank holiday was fixed as the last Monday in May.

Until the 13th century the Manor of Kingsteignton was a crown demesne. In 1509 the manor passed to the Clifford family who still hold the title of Lord of the Manor today.

The area gained minor publicity in July 2017, when local MP Anne Marie Morris used a racist remark in a speech concerning Brexit. She was subsequently suspended by the Conservative Party.

Culture
The local secondary school is Teign School, which also includes a 6th form college. Primary schools are St Michaels and Rydon. A third primary school has been built opposite Teign School called Kingsteignton School. The principal of the school is called Dr Penny Fitch. The town is twinned with Orbec, France.

Geology
Fine quality ball clay beds created some 30–40 million years ago during the Oligocene Period lie on the eastern edge of the Bovey Basin near Kingsteignton. The exploitation of these clays began in the late 17th century when it was discovered that their properties made them eminently suitable for pipe making. Their white firing properties attracted interest from potters looking for materials to improve their wares and their exploitation was boosted in 1791 when Josiah Wedgwood first purchased Kingsteignton clay. Over the past 200 years clay mining has brought continued employment and prosperity to Kingsteignton.

Limestone has been extensively quarried at various times on either side of Golvers Hill at Rydon, Coombesend and Gildons. Kingsteignton Quarry at Rydon (now infilled) supplied stone for the building of Buckfast Abbey. Numerous limekilns, some still in existence, were found along the dry valley that extends from Rydon to Lindridge and along the Coombesend valley. The kiln at Kiln Forehead was demolished during the extension of Calvados Park whilst the kiln beside Rydon school was partly demolished and buried under an earth bank when the lane to Rydon Quarry was widened.

Sand and gravel has also been extensively quarried at Babcombe Copse, Sands Copse and Heathfield, the latter becoming a large landfill site.
Lysons' Magna Britannia mentions that the ancient Britons extracted alluvial tin from the gravels deposited by the river Teign.

Historic estates
The parish of Kingsteignton includes various historic estates including:
Whiteway, a Domesday Book manor and later a seat of the Yard family, today a farmhouse known as Whiteway Barton.

Sport and leisure
Newton Abbot RFC (established 1873) are based in Kingsteignton, playing home games at Rackerhayes. Kingsteignton AFC, known as the Rams play at Broadpark and compete in the South Devon Football League.

References

External links
 Kingsteignton Town Council

 
Towns in Devon
Former manors in Devon
Teignbridge